Jean-Luc Castaneda (born 20 March 1957 in Saint-Etienne, Loire) is a French former professional footballer who played as a goalkeeper for France. Castaneda began his professional career with AS Saint-Étienne in 1975. He also played for the France national team. He earned nine caps in 1981–82 and was part of the French squad for the 1982 FIFA World Cup (Castaneda played one match against Poland). In 1989, he joined the Olympique Marseille and retired in 1990. Castaneda coached FC Istres and US Marseille Endoume.

Personal life
Castaneda's father was born in Barcelona, Spain and was a soldier and footballer in his youth.

References

1957 births
Living people
French people of Spanish descent
French people of Catalan descent
French footballers
Footballers from Saint-Étienne
Association football goalkeepers
France international footballers
AS Saint-Étienne players
Olympique de Marseille players
Ligue 1 players
Ligue 2 players
1982 FIFA World Cup players
French football managers
FC Istres managers
Al-Rayyan SC managers